Manlove is a surname. Notable people with the surname include:

Bill Manlove (born 1933), former American football coach, president of the American Football Coaches Association
Charlie Manlove (1862–1952), 19th-century Major League Baseball player born in Philadelphia, Pennsylvania
Colin Manlove (1942–2020), British literary critic with a particular interest in fantasy
Dudley Manlove (1914–1996), American radio announcer and actor
Eugene Manlove Rhodes (1869–1934), American writer who was nicknamed the "cowboy chronicler"
Joe J. Manlove (1876–1956), U.S. Representative from Missouri
Timothy Manlove (1663–1699), English Presbyterian minister and physician

See also
USS Manlove (DE-36), Evarts-class destroyer escort of the United States Navy during World War II